Pachyderm Recording Studio is a residential music recording studio located in Cannon Falls, Minnesota, United States, 35.8 mi (57.6 km) southeast of Minneapolis–Saint Paul International Airport. It is located in a secluded old-growth forest in rural Minnesota.

The studio was founded in 1988 by Jim Nickel, Mark Walk and Eric S. Anderson, with acoustic design by Bret Theney of Westlake Audio. It boasted the same Neve 8068 recording console that was used in Jimi Hendrix's Electric Lady Studios as well as Studer tape machines. The house was designed by Herb Bloomberg, architect of Old Log Theatre and founder of the Chanhassen Dinner Theatres.

The studio went into a decline in the mid-2000s, after original co-owner Jim Nickel sold the property. It went into a state of disrepair for many years, though bands occasionally still recorded there. It was purchased by engineer John Kuker in 2011 out of foreclosure and remodeled over the next three years. Kuker died on February 2, 2015, at the age of 40.

The studio is currently operational; the home, studio and grounds have been renovated. Musicians are able to use and record with the wide variety of musical equipment and guitars that Kuker collected.

Selected recordings made at Pachyderm

 Red Tail – Dave Simonett (2020)
 Furnace – Dead Man Winter (2017)
 Sigourney Fever – Trampled by Turtles (2019)
 Life Is Good on the Open Road – Trampled by Turtles (2018)
 Wild Animals – Trampled by Turtles (2014)
 Armchair Apocrypha – Andrew Bird (2007)
 Arise Therefore – Palace (1996)
 From Here to Infirmary  – Alkaline Trio (2001)
 Grave Dancers Union – Soul Asylum (1992)
 Hollywood Town Hall – The Jayhawks (1992)
 In Utero – Nirvana (1993)
 Rapture – Bradley Joseph (1997)
 Rid of Me – PJ Harvey (1993)
 Seamonsters – The Wedding Present (1991)
 Stuart Davis – Stuart Davis (2001)
 Sound as Ever – You Am I (1993)
 The End of All Things to Come  – Mudvayne (2002)
 Throwing Copper – Live (1994)
 Fontanelle – Babes In Toyland (1992)
 Prog – The Bad Plus (2007)
 Panic Stations – Motion City Soundtrack (2015)
 Polar Similar – Norma Jean (2016)
 Good News for Modern Man – Grant Hart (1999)
 Still Thirsty – Four Pints Shy (2018)
 Once Twice Melody – Beach House (2022)
 The Cooling – Reina del Cid (2015)

References

External links 
 
 Live Nirvana Sessions History: In Utero
 Pachyderm Studio's old website - archived version of the studio's pre-2009 website
 Pachyderm Studio's words from clients - a list of experiences by artists who have recorded at Pachyderm Studios

Buildings and structures in Goodhue County, Minnesota
Music venues in Minnesota
Recording studios in the United States
1988 establishments in Minnesota